Rosa Anna Tantillo (born August 6, 1984) is an American soccer player from San Diego, California. She is a midfielder for the San Diego WFC SeaLions and previously played for Women's Professional Soccer club FC Gold Pride.

She served as an undergraduate assistant coach for USC in 2007.

References

External links
FC Gold Pride player profile
USC player profile

Living people
American women's soccer players
USC Trojans women's soccer players
Pali Blues players
FC Gold Pride players
1984 births
USL W-League (1995–2015) players
Women's association football midfielders
Women's Professional Soccer players